Elisha Mathewson (April 18, 1767October 14, 1853) was a United States senator from Rhode Island.

Youth and career
Born in Scituate, Rhode Island, Mathewson pursued an academic course and was justice of the peace of Scituate. He engaged in agricultural pursuits and in 1821 was a member of the Rhode Island House of Representatives, and served as speaker during that period. He was a member of the Rhode Island Senate in 1822, and was elected as a Democratic-Republican to the U.S. Senate to fill the vacancy caused by the resignation of James Fenner and served from October 26, 1807, to March 3, 1811.

Mathewson resumed agricultural pursuits and died in Scituate in 1853; interment was on his farm at the north end of Moswansicut Lake, Scituate.

References

1767 births
1853 deaths
Members of the Rhode Island House of Representatives
Rhode Island state senators
United States senators from Rhode Island
People from Scituate, Rhode Island
Rhode Island Democratic-Republicans
Democratic-Republican Party United States senators
Speakers of the Rhode Island House of Representatives